Mr. Floppy's Flophouse was a mansion in East Oakland that at one time housed a bordello and saloon patronized by writer Jack London; in later years a picture of the writer was placed behind the elegant bar. In the early 1990s it was also the home to a well-known, wild underground party and rave.  Mr. Floppy himself was said to be an elusive archeologist from Finland who, when not busy excavating an inverted pyramid thought to house the knowledge of all mankind, was hosting late night events in the bowels of one of Oakland's most notorious districts. The party that never happened, "Go Native" was shut down from Native American communities in Texas from online social networks! Picketers and some representing the party stood ground the night the party was held. That night sparked them all which  began a slew of parties ranging from psytrance to dubstep around 2009. 

The flophouse had around 15-20 different rooms, with something different going on in each.  In the main ballroom, DJ's and acts such as Psychic TV or Olli Wisdom would perform, while upstairs boasted any variety of acts ranging from a naked man playing sitar, to freestyle house, to a black light mushroom garden paradise.

The organizers were granted by the City of Oakland all needed permits to host the events. It was the goal of the organizers to provide a fun and safe atmosphere for its patrons.

At dawn it was not uncommon for George, the owner of the property, to appear in a wizard cape serving shrimp cups or noodle soups from behind his piano.

References

External links
 The Bordello/ Mr. Floppy's Funhouse. Findery.

Houses in Oakland, California